Colobodactylus (common name: Amaral's teiids) is a small genus of lizards in the family Gymnophthalmidae. The genus is endemic to Brazil.

Species
There are two species in the genus Colobodactylus.
Colobodactylus dalcyanus  - Vanzolini's teiid
Colobodactylus taunayi  - Taunay teiid

Etymology
The specific name, dalcyanus, is in honor of Brazilian entomologist Dalcy de Oliveira Albuquerque (1902–1982).

The specific name, taunayi, is in honor of Brazilian historian Afonso d'Escragnolle Taunay (1876–1958).

References

Further reading
Amaral A (1933). "Estudos sobre Lacertilios neotropicos. I. Novos generos e especies de lagartos do Brasil ". Memorias do Instituto Butantan 7: 51–75. (Colobodactylus, new genus, p. 70; Colobodactylus taunayi, new species, pp. 70–71). (in Portuguese).

 
Endemic fauna of Brazil
Reptiles of Brazil
Taxa named by Afrânio Pompílio Gastos do Amaral